The Port Vale Player of the Year award is voted for annually by Port Vale's supporters in recognition of the best overall performance by an individual player throughout the football season. Towards the end of each season, fans are invited to cast their votes for this award.

The inaugural award was made to Roy Sproson in 1967, and became an annual event from Ron Wilson's victory in 1969. David Harris (1974 and 1977), Ray Walker (1988 and 1991), Mark Grew (1989 and 1992), Neil Aspin (1990 and 1994), and Martin Foyle (1995 and 1999) have all won two awards during their time at Vale Park. Aspin and Foyle both also went on to manage the club, whilst Grew spent three spells as caretaker-manager. Tom Pope is the only player to win the award three times, winning in 2013, 2014 and 2018. Eamonn O'Keefe and Anthony Griffith represented Ireland and Montserrat respectively at international level, though both players were born in England. Speaking after receiving his first award in April 2013, Tom Pope stated that "To be voted for by the fans like this is a massive honour for me. It means such a lot, more than the other [PFA] awards I've been lucky enough to win." Midfielders are more commonly rewarded, claiming 19 wins.

The current holder is midfielder Ben Garrity, following his consistent performances throughout the 2021–22 season.

Winners

Wins by playing position

Wins by nationality

Footnotes
A.  For ease of reading, the complexities of the frequent renaming of the various divisions have been simplified to a number, reflecting the official "Level" of competition in the English league system. For more information see English football league system#Structure.

B.  For a full description of positions, see Association football positions.

C.  Inaugural winner.

D.  Second award.

E.  First non-British winner.

F.  Multiple winners are counted multiple times.

G.  Third award.

References
General

Specific

Port Vale F.C. players
Players
Association football player non-biographical articles